Cai Haochang (born 23 February 1999) is a Chinese footballer currently playing as a midfielder for Meizhou Hakka.

Club career
Cai Haochang would play for youth teams in Guangzhou before joining Portuguese football club Gondomar on 14 September 2017. He would initially start in their youth team before graduating into their senior team and would make his debut appearance on 18 August 2018 against S.C. Mêda in a league game that ended in a 5-2 victory. On 30 September 2020, Cai would return to China to join second club Meizhou Hakka, where he made his debut on 7 October 2020 in a league game against Jiangxi Liansheng in a 3-2 victory. He would then go on to be a vital member of the team that gained promotion to the top tier after coming second within the division at the end of the 2021 China League One campaign.

Career statistics
.

References

External links

1999 births
Living people
Chinese footballers
China youth international footballers
Chinese expatriate footballers
Association football midfielders
Campeonato de Portugal (league) players
China League One players
Guangzhou City F.C. players
Guangzhou F.C. players
Gondomar S.C. players
Meizhou Hakka F.C. players
Chinese expatriate sportspeople in Portugal
Expatriate footballers in Portugal